In Nordic mythology, Asgard (Old Norse: Ásgarðr ; "enclosure of the Æsir") is a location associated with the gods. It appears in a multitude of Old Norse sagas and mythological texts. It is described as the fortified home of the Æsir gods, often associated with gold imagery. Many of the best-known Nordic gods are Æsir or live in Asgard such as Odin, Thor, Loki, and Baldr.

Etymology 
Possible anglicisations include: Ásgarthr, Ásgard, Ásegard, Ásgardr, Asgardr, Ásgarth, Asgarth, Esageard, and Ásgardhr.

Attestations

The Poetic Edda 
Asgard is named twice in Eddic poetry. The first case is in Hymiskviða, when Thor and Týr journey from Asgard to Hymir's hall to obtain a cauldron large enough to brew beer for a feast for Ægir and the gods. The second instance is in Þrymskviða when Loki is attempting to convince Thor to dress up as Freyja in order to get back Mjölnir by claiming that without his hammer to protect them, jötnar would soon be living in Asgard. 

Grímnismál contains among its cosmological descriptions, a number of abodes of the gods, such as Álfheim, Nóatún and Valhall, which some scholars have identified as being in Asgard. It is to be noted, however, that Asgard is not mentioned at any point in the poem. Furthermore, Völuspá references Iðavöllr, one of the most common meeting places of Æsir gods, which in Gylfaginning, Snorri locates in the centre of Asgard.

The Prose Edda

Prologue 
The Prose Edda's euhemeristic prologue portrays the Æsir gods as people that travelled from the East to northern territories. According to Snorri, Asgard represented the town of Troy before Greek warriors overtook it. After the defeat, Trojans moved to northern Europe, where they became a dominant group due to their “advanced technologies and culture”. Eventually, other tribes began to perceive the Trojans and their leader Trór (Thor in Old Norse) as gods.

Gylfaginning 
In Gylfaginning, Snorri Sturluson describes how during the creation of the world, the gods made the earth and surrounded it with the sea. They set down the brows of Ymir, forming Midgard, and in the centre of the world they built Asgard, which he identifies as Troy:

After Asgard is made, the gods then built a hof named Glaðsheimr at Iðavöllr, in the centre of the burg, with a high seat for Odin and twelve seats for other gods. It is described as like gold both on the inside and the outside, and as the best of all buildings in the world. They also built Vingólf for the female gods, which is described as both a hall and a hörgr, and a forge with which they crafted objects from gold. After Ragnarök, some gods such as Váli and Baldr will meet at Iðavöllr where Asgard once stood and discuss matters together. There they will also find in the grass the golden chess pieces that the Æsir had once owned.

Later, the section describes how an unnamed jötunn came to the gods with his stallion, Svaðilfari and offered help in building a burg for the gods in three winters, asking in return for the sun, moon, and marriage with Freyja. Despite Freyja's opposition, together the gods agree to fulfill his request if he completes his work in just one winter. As time goes on, the gods grow desperate as it becomes apparent that the jötunn will construct the burg on time. To their surprise, his stallion contributes much of the progress, swiftly moving boulders and rocks. To deal with the problem, Loki comes up with a plan whereupon he changes his appearance to that of a mare, and distracts Svaðilfari to slow down construction. Without the help of his stallion, the builder realises he cannot complete his task in time and goes into a rage, revealing his identity as a jötunn. Thor then kills the builder with Mjöllnir, before any harm to the gods is done. The chapter does not explicitly name Asgard as the fortress but they are commonly identified by scholars.

In Gylfaginning, the central cosmic tree Yggdrasil is described as having three roots that hold it up; one of these goes to the Æsir, which has been interpreted as meaning Asgard. In Grímnismál, this root instead reaches over the realm of men. The bridge Bifröst is told to span from the heavens to the earth and over it the Æsir cross each day to hold council beneath Yggdrasil at the Urðarbrunnr. Based on this, Bifröst is commonly interpreted as the bridge to Asgard.

Skáldskaparmál 
Asgard is mentioned briefly throughout Skáldskaparmál as the name for the home of the Æsir, as in Gylfaginning. In this section, a number of locations are described as lying within Asgard including Valhalla, and in front of its doors, the golden grove Glasir. It also records a name for Thor as 'Defender of Ásgard'.

Ynglinga Saga 
In the Ynglinga saga, found in Heimskringla, Snorri describes Asgard as a city in Asia, based on a perceived, but erroneous, connection between the words for Asia and Æsir. Odin then leaves to settle in the northern part of the world and leaves his brothers Vili and Vé to rule over the city. When the euhemerised Odin dies, the account states that the Swedes believed he had returned to Asgard and would live there forever.

Interpretation and discussion
Cosmology in Old Nordic religion is presented in a vague and often contradictory manner when viewed from a naturalistic standpoint. He also locates the homes of the gods in the heavens. This had led to the proposition of a system of concentric circles, centred on Asgard or Yggdrasil, and sometimes with a vertical axis, leading upwards towards the heavens. There is debate between scholars over whether the gods were conceived of as living in the heavens, with some aligning their views with Snorri, and others proposing that he at times presents the system in a Christian framework and that this organisation is not seen in either Eddic or skaldic poetry. The concept of attempting to create a spatial cosmological model has itself been criticised by scholars who argue that the oral traditions did not form a naturalistic, structured system that aimed to be internally geographically consistent. An alternative proposal is that the world should be conceived of as a number of realms connected by passages that cannot be typically traversed. This would explain how Asgard can be located both to the east and west of the realm of men, over the sea and over Bifröst.

It has been noted that the tendency to link Asgard to Troy is part of a wider European cultural practice of claiming Trojan origins for one's culture, first seen in the Aeneid and also featuring in Geoffrey of Monmouth's Historia regum Britanniae for the founding of Britain.

Depictions in popular culture 
Thor first appeared in the Marvel Universe within comic series Journey into Mystery in the issues #83 during August 1962. Following this release, he becomes one of the central figures in the comics along with Loki and Odin. In the Marvel Cinematic Universe, Thor and Loki make their first appearance together in the 2011 film Thor. After that, Thor becomes a regular character in the Marvel Cinematic Universe and reappears in several films, including the Avengers series. Asgard becomes the central element of the film Thor: Ragnarok, where it is destroyed following the Old Norse mythos. These and other Norse mythology elements also appear in video games, TV series, and books based in and on the Marvel Universe, although these depictions do not closely follow historical sources.

Asgard is an explorable realm in the video game God of War: Ragnarök, a sequel to 2018's soft reboot Norse-themed God of War.

In the Assassin's Creed Valhalla video game, Asgard is featured as part of a "vision quest".

See also
 Mount Olympus - home of the Olympian gods

Citations

Bibliography

Primary

Secondary

External Links 
 MyNDIR (My Norse Digital Image repository) illustrations of Asgard from Victorian and Edwardian retellings of Norse Mythology. Clicking on the thumbnail will give you the full image and information concerning it.

Locations in Norse mythology